AS Bamako is a Malian football club based in Bamako. They play in the top division in Malian football. Their home stadium is Stade Municipal de Bamako.

Achievements
 Malien Cup: 1
 2005

Performance in CAF competitions
CAF Confederation Cup: 2 appearances
2006 – Second Round
2007 – Preliminary Round

Squad

References

Championnat national : Le Djoliba repasse en tête l’Essor n°16204 du – 2008-05-26

Football clubs in Mali
Sport in Bamako
Association football clubs established in 1999
1999 establishments in Mali